Alhaj Shahjee Gul Afridi (born 1 January 1961) is a Pakistani politician who had been a member of the National Assembly of Pakistan from June 2013 to May 2018.

Early life

He was born on 1 January 1961.

He is brother of  Taj Muhammad Afridi.

Political career
He ran for the seat of the National Assembly of Pakistan as an independent candidate from Constituency NA-46 (Tribal Area-XI) in 2002 Pakistani general election but was unsuccessful and lost the seat to an independent candidate, Khalilur Rehman Afridi.

He was elected to the National Assembly as an independent candidate from Constituency NA-45 (Tribal Area-X) in 2013 Pakistani general election. He received 29,697 votes and defeated an independent candidate, Pir Noor ul Haq Qadri.

References

Living people
Afridi family
Pakistani MNAs 2013–2018
People from Khyber Pakhtunkhwa
1961 births
Place of birth missing (living people)